FDL may refer to:
 Fast Deployment Logistics Ship (FDL), U.S. Navy shipbuilding program of the middle 1960s, eventually cancelled (see USNS Lynn (T-AG-182)).
 Federation of Liberals, an Italian political party
 Federal Depository Library, a library in the Federal Depository Library Program
 File Definition Language - used to describe the structure of a Record Management Services file in the OpenVMS operating system.
 Firebase Dynamic Links, smart URLs that link to any location within iOS, Android or web apps
 Firedoglake, a defunct political blog
 Fleur-de-lis (disambiguation)
 Flexor digitorum longus muscle
 Florida Democratic League, an American political advocacy group
 Fond du Lac (disambiguation)
 Fossa dei Leoni, an Italian football supporters organisation
 Four Door Lemon, a British video game developer
 Fonds de Dotation du Libre - Libre Endowment Fund (FDL), French fund to support developers and publishers of Free and Open Source software projects
 GE FDL, a series of diesel engines
 GNU Free Documentation License
 United States Air Force Flight Dynamics Laboratory